The Thirtieth Amendment of the Constitution (Houses of the Oireachtas Inquiries) Bill 2011 (bill no. 47 of 2011) was a proposed amendment to the Constitution of Ireland to provide for the Houses of the Oireachtas to conduct full inquiries. The bill was passed by both houses of the Oireachtas, but rejected at a referendum held on 27 October 2011.

Background

On 20 April 2000 in Abbeylara, John Carthy, who had bipolar affective disorder, barricaded himself into his residence with a shotgun in a dispute over plans to move to a new house. The Garda Emergency Response Unit (ERU) was called to the scene, and after a 25-hour siege, Carthy was shot dead. Carthy's family claimed the Garda had mishandled the situation and that a planned Garda internal inquiry would be inadequate. On 8 March 2001, the Oireachtas Joint Committee on Justice, Equality, Defence and Women's Rights established a "Sub-Committee on the Abbeylara Incident". Although the Carthy family wanted an independent Tribunal of Inquiry, an Oireachtas inquiry was preferred as being cheaper and quicker. It planned to complete its investigation in three weeks and then issue conclusions. The Sub-Committee claimed the right to compel ERU members to give evidence, under the Committees of the Houses of the Oireachtas (Compellability, Privileges and Immunities of Witnesses) Act, 1997. The ERU members sought judicial review that the subcommittee would be acting ultra vires in compelling them to attend and then issuing a report that criticised them. On 11 March 2002, the Supreme Court agreed, by six votes to one.

The Oireachtas instead established a Tribunal of Inquiry, called the Barr Tribunal after its sole member, Robert Barr. This tribunal sat in public for 208 days between 7 January 2003 and 7 December 2004. Its 744-page report was issued on 20 July 2006. Its total cost was almost €18 million.

From November 2010 to January 2011, the Oireachtas Joint Committee on the Constitution reviewed the Parliamentary Power of Inquiry under Article 15. Its January 2011 report recommended a Constitutional amendment, to be followed by enabling legislation and a protocol under the standing orders of each House. Oireachtas inquiries would "avoid great expense and interminable delay" of tribunals of inquiry, and could make findings of wrongdoing but not impose sanctions. The wording the Joint Committee proposed for Article 15 was:
 The Houses of the Oireachtas shall have the power to inquire into any matter of general public importance.
 In the course of such inquiry the Houses may investigate any individual and make findings in relation to their conduct.
 The conduct of such inquiries shall be regulated by law. Such law shall balance the rights of the individual with the public interest in the effective investigation of matters of general public importance.

In their manifestos for the 2011 general election, both Fine Gael and Labour promised an amendment to overturn the 2002 Abbeylara verdict. The programme of the coalition they formed after the election committed to holding referendums "on a priority basis" on five subjects, including "the granting of full investigative powers for Oireachtas committees". Opposition parties were consulted about the wording of the proposed amendment.

Proposed change to the text
The amendment proposed to insert the following subsections highlighted in bold to Article 15.10:

Process
The amendment bill was published on 12 September 2011. It was introduced in Dáil Éireann on 15 September 2011 by the Minister for Public Expenditure and Reform, Brendan Howlin, and passed final stages in the Dáil on 20 September by 102 votes to 10. It passed all stages in Seanad Éireann on 21 September. All proposed constitutional amendments are required to be put to a popular referendum before becoming law. The referendum was held on 27 October 2011, on the same day as the 2011 presidential election and a referendum on another proposed constitutional amendment, relating to judges' pay.

A referendum commission was established, under the terms of the Referendum Act 1998, to provide voters with non-partisan information about the proposal. The commission was chaired by Bryan McMahon, a former judge of the High Court. On 11 October, the commission launched a media information campaign and began distributing an information booklet to households in the state.

The Oireachtas Joint Committee on Investigations, Oversight and Petitions was established in July 2011 based on Dáil and Seanad resolutions passed the previous month. Its initial orders of reference did not allude to Oireachtas investigations, but in September the government published the heads of the Oireachtas (Powers of Inquiry) Bill, 2011; if the referendum had been passed, the latter bill would then also have been passed to regulate the conduct of Oireachtas inquiries held under the terms of the amended Constitution, giving a leading role to the Joint Committee.

Campaign
The Irish Examiner suggested the amendment would increase the ability of the Oireachtas to investigate the 2008–2011 Irish banking crisis. Stephen Collins raised the possibility of the Fine Gael–Labour government using an Oireachtas inquiry as a witch-hunt to heap blame on its Fianna Fáil predecessor.

The Irish Times commented that coverage of the Presidential election limited public debate on the two referendums being held the same day; it stated "Because [the Thirtieth Amendment] proposes to give the Oireachtas far more power than it has ever previously enjoyed, it therefore needs careful consideration by the electorate before it decides". Stephen Collins criticised the speed with which the Bill was rushed through both Houses, while describing some lawyers' criticisms of it as "laughable". Collins called the cost of tribunals of inquiry "scandalous" but pointed out that the Nyberg and Cloyne reports were delivered under the pre-existing Commissions of Investigation Act 2004. Tánaiste Eamon Gilmore suggested much of the opposition to the amendment came from "particular sections of the legal profession who have done very well financially from the judicial tribunals in the past".

In the Irish Independent, Dearbhail McDonald said she would vote no, saying 'it will be up to politicians, vulnerable to swings in public mood and media pressure ... to decide what "balance" of rights witnesses are entitled to'. She cited the example of Senator Ivor Callely's successful appeal to the High Court to overturn a Seanad vote of censure, suggesting such redress might be unavailable if the referendum were passed. Minister Brendan Howlin said that advice from the Attorney General is "crystal clear" that the courts will retain judicial review over the way the Oireachtas balances rights. David Gwynn Morgan concurs, while Vincent Browne expressed scepticism.

Groups supporting the amendment included the government Fine Gael and Labour parties and the opposition Fianna Fáil and Sinn Féin parties. Groups opposing included the United Left Alliance, 12 independent TDs and senators, the Bar Council and Law Society, and the Irish Council for Civil Liberties (ICCL). While Fianna Fáil supported the amendment, its spokesperson on health, Billy Kelleher, intended to vote against it, and former minister Mary O'Rourke described it as "pointless". On 23 October, eight former Attorneys General signed a letter opposing the amendment. The ICCL saw the amendment wording passed by the Houses in September as inferior to that agreed by the Committee in January.

The National Union of Journalists wrote to the Referendum Commission of members' concerns that press freedom and reporters' privilege might be impaired.

Opinion polls

Result

About 5,000 people fewer voted in the referendum than in the Presidential election held simultaneously with the same electorate. Counting began on 29 October, after counting in the Presidential election was completed. The result was announced at Dublin Castle that evening:

Votes were counted separately in each Dáil constituency and sent to the returning officer in Dublin Castle.

Aftermath

Causes
Politicians and journalists suggested several factors contributed to the defeat of the referendum.

Harry McGee in The Irish Times, and Seán Fleming, the Fianna Fáil spokesperson on Public Expenditure and Reform, mentioned the rushed nature of the legislative process. After its formation in February, the government had a long list of proposed amendments; the Oireachtas inquiries was not brought to the head of the list till the summer recess, and then rushed through in the autumn.

Holding two referendums and the Presidential election simultaneously reduced media time for debate; some underinformed voters adopted a policy of "if you don't know vote no".

The precise wording of the amendment was considered vague by many; Harry McGee mentioned that the Referendum Commission's information booklet drew attention to this. Brendan Howlin, the sponsoring minister, suggested in The Sunday Times that the Referendum Commission's briefing had caused confusion. The Commission publicly objected to what it saw as a criticism of its impartiality and of its chairman personally. Howlin apologised and described his original comments as "cack-handed". Law lecturer Donncha O'Connell characterised the Referendum Commission's advertising campaign as "facile and patronising". In April 2012, The Irish Times reported that an unpublished briefing produced by the Commission for minister Phil Hogan described as "grossly inadequate" the five weeks it had had to fulfil its functions.

The electorate retained a distrust of politicians previously evident in the general election in February 2011; journalists suggested voters did not trust politicians to wield quasi-judicial power.

Seán Fleming criticised the government's perceived arrogance during the campaign. Journalists mentioned in particular Alan Shatter's dismissive response to the Attorney Generals' voicing of opposition. Joan Burton's regret for a Prime Time debate between Howlin and Michael McDowell was seen by Mary Regan of the Irish Examiner as a veiled critique of her Labour-Party cabinet colleague.

Consequences
The government's statement after the result was:
It is disappointing that the 30th amendment has been narrowly defeated but the Constitution is something that belongs to the people and we acknowledge and accept the people's democratic decision. We will reflect and carefully consider the outcome of this referendum.

Brendan Howlin suggested the government's plans for a large number of further Constitutional amendments would be made less ambitious. The constitutional convention planned for 2012 might be delayed to 2014. Much of the work planned for the Oireachtas Committee on Investigations, Oversight and Petitions was predicated on the amendment passing. Eamon Gilmore suggested the planned Oireachtas inquiry into the banking crisis would no longer be able to proceed.

Gilmore suggested the subject might be revisited by a future referendum. Donncha O'Connell suggested that public support was still strong for the principle of Oireachtas inquiries, and that a future retry for a similar amendment should return to the model suggested by the Oireachtas Committee is January 2011.

In December, the Minister Howlin appeared before the Oireachtas Joint Committee on Investigations, Oversight and Petitions to discuss amending its terms of reference in light of the defeat of the referendum. In January 2012, new terms of reference were published for the committee, to be renamed the Joint Committee on Public Service Oversight and Petitions.

The government commissioned a report from three academics on factors influencing the public's vote, and lessons for future referendums. The report was published on 22 February 2012, and discussed at a meeting of the Oireachtas Committee on Investigations, Oversight and Petitions.

References

External links
Oireachtas site: Thirtieth Amendment of the Constitution (Houses of the Oireachtas Inquiries) Bill 2011
Full text of the Constitution of Ireland

2011 in Irish law
2011 in Irish politics
30
30
October 2011 events in Europe
Amendment, 30, 2011
Parliamentary procedure
Oireachtas
Public inquiries in Ireland